Lake Butler is a census-designated place (CDP) and unincorporated area, completely surrounding the town of Windermere, in Orange County, Florida, United States. The population was 15,400 at the 2010 census, up from 7,062 at the 2000 census. It is part of the Orlando–Kissimmee–Sanford, Florida Metropolitan Statistical Area.

The Lake Butler CDP contains the communities of Isleworth and Summerport Beach.

Geography

There are several lakes in the vicinity, the largest of which is Lake Butler. Others nearby include Lake William Davis, Lake Cypress, Lake Louise, and Lake Bessie.

Demographics
As of the census of 2000, there were 7,062 people, 2,255 households, and 2,009 families residing in the CDP. The population density was 210.6/km2 (545.4/mi2). There were 2,451 housing units at an average density of 73.1/km2 (189.3/mi2). The racial makeup of the CDP was 89.75% White, 3.41% African American, 0.14% Native American, 3.91% Asian, 0.03% Pacific Islander, 0.74% from other races, and 2.02% from two or more races. Hispanic or Latino of any race were 4.67% of the population.

There were 2,255 households, out of which 49.5% had children under the age of 18 living with them, 82.0% were married couples living together, 4.8% had a female householder with no husband present, and 10.9% were non-families. 8.0% of all households were made up of individuals, and 2.1% had someone living alone who was 65 years of age or older. The average household size was 3.13 and the average family size was 3.32.

In the CDP, the population was spread out, with 32.5% under the age of 18, 4.3% from 18 to 24, 29.3% from 25 to 44, 27.2% from 45 to 64, and 6.7% who were 65 years of age or older. The median age was 38 years. For every 100 females, there were 98.8 males. For every 100 females age 18 and over, there were 97.5 males.

The median income for a household in the CDP was $113,819, and the median income for a family was $113,863. Males had a median income of $89,507 versus $43,864 for females. The per capita income for the CDP was $49,696. About 1.2% of families and 1.8% of the population were below the poverty line, including 1.7% of those under age 18 and 3.0% of those age 65 or over.

Education
Lake Butler is within Orange County Public Schools.

Portions of Lake Butler are served by Bridgewater Middle School, Sunridge Middle School, Gotha Middle School, and Chain of Lakes Middle School.

When Windermere High School in Lake Butler opens in 2017, much of Lake Butler will be in its attendance boundary. The Windermere High portion was previously assigned to West Orange High School, which continues to serve other parts of Lake Butler. Other parts of Lake Butler are served by Olympia High School, and small portion is zoned to Dr. Phillips High School.

The private school Windermere Preparatory School is located in Lake Butler.

References

Unincorporated communities in Orange County, Florida
Census-designated places in Orange County, Florida
Greater Orlando
Census-designated places in Florida
Unincorporated communities in Florida